The Civil Service of the People's Republic of China is the administrative system of the traditional Chinese government which consists of all levels who run the day-to-day affairs in China. The members of the civil service are selected through competitive examination.

As of 2009, China has about 10 million civil servants who are managed under the Civil Service Law. Most civil servants work in government agencies and departments. State leaders and cabinet members, who normally would be considered politicians in political systems with competing political parties and elections, also come under the civil service in China. Civil servants are not necessarily members of the Chinese Communist Party (CCP), but 95 percent of civil servants in leading positions from division (county) level and above are CCP members.

History 
A professional corps of dedicate bureaucrats, akin to a modern civil service, has been an integral feature of governance in Chinese civilization for much of its history. Part of the motivation was ideological; Confucian teaching discouraged overly involved, warlike, and rowdy rulers alike, making the delegation of legislative and executive authority particularly necessary. During the Zhou dynasty (c. 1046 – 256 BC), records show that kings would send edicts encouraging local officials to identify promising candidates for office in the capital. This practice was intensified under Emperor Wu of Han (r. 141 – 87 BC), who standardized the selection process with the addition of question-and-answer elements on classic texts judged by a panel of scholars. This helped lay the groundwork for the Imperial examination system that would be formed under the short-lived Sui dynasty before being widely adopted thereafter. The examination system and the bureaucracy it engendered would remain in place in some form until the dissolution of the Qing dynasty in 1911.

Mao-era cadres
The People's Republic of China did not initially maintain a formal civil service like other countries of the era. As the CCP gained ground in the Chinese Civil War against the Kuomintang (KMT), it instead used dedicated Party cadres to oversee and administer territories it took over. The CCP, at the time of its victory in 1949, faced a serious shortage of qualified personnel to the fill over 2.7 million public positions needed to govern the country that had previously been occupied by KMT-affiliated officials, some of whom the Party had to allow to continue to work due to lack of suitable replacements. By the mid-1950s, China had developed a nomenklatura system modeled on the Soviet Union; there was no civil service independent of the ruling party.

Reform
Following the death of Mao Zedong and the rise of reformist Deng Xiaoping, efforts began to change the cadre system after the discord of the Cultural Revolution so that the Party would be able to effectively carry out the modernization of China. Reforms beginning in 1984 did not decrease the approximately 8.1 million cadre positions across China, but began to decentralize their management to authorities at provincial and local levels.

Zhao Ziyang, elected General Secretary of the Chinese Communist Party in 1987, sought to transform the cadre system into a more independent body resembling a civil service. The civil service not completely subservient to the CCP, and thus reform the relationship between the Party and the Chinese state. In the aftermath of the 1989 Tiananmen Square protests, Zhao and his allies lost their influence among Party elite and the civil service reform project was denounced by remaining leaders. Zhao's proposals were subsequently heavily modified and implemented as the "Provisional Regulations on State Civil Servants" in 1993, albeit on a much less comprehensive scale.

Nevertheless, the Provisional Regulations established the first formal civil service in China since the founding of the People's Republic.

Definition
The definition of civil servant, a term formally codified in the 2006 Civil Service Law  is often ambiguous in China. Most broadly, civil servants in China are a subset of CCP cadres, the class of professional staff who administer and manage Chinese government, party, military, and major business institutions. More specifically, the term denotes public employees in higher positions of authority; according to Yuenyuen Ang, they "form the elite strata of functionaries in the party-state hierarchy", in contrast to shiye renyuan (事业人员) or 'shiye' personnel, who are also public employees but are not considered gongwuyuan.

The definition of the civil service differs from that of many western countries. Civil servants are "the managers, administrators and professionals who work for government bodies," including leadership such as the Premier, state councillors, ministers, and provincial governors, among others. It excludes manual workers and many other types of cadre, such as those employed in public service units such as hospitals, universities, or state-owned enterprises, even though those positions are also paid and managed by the government. While not strictly part of the civil service, the judiciary is governed by the same personnel arrangements as the civil service.

Levels and ranking system
The current ranking system has 27 different ranks (from previously of total 15 levels) and a grade system within each rank (at most 14 grades for each rank) to reflect seniority and  performance; a combination of rank and  ultimately determine pay and benefits.

The 27 ranks are sub-divisions of 11 "levels". The following is a non-exhaustive list of party and state positions corresponding to their civil service rank. The list only comprises "leadership positions", but not civil servants who are not in leadership positions. Non-leading civil servants can be given high corresponding ranks. For example, an expert or advisor hired by the government on a long-term initiative does not manage any people or lead any organization, but may still receive a sub-provincial rank. Similarly, retired officials who take on lesser-ranked (usually ceremonial) positions after retirement would generally retain their highest rank. Occasionally, officials may hold a position but be of a higher rank than what the position indicates, for example a Deputy Prefecture-level Party Secretary who holds a full prefecture-level rank.

State Administration of Civil Service
The State Administration of Civil Service was created in March 2008 by the National People's Congress. It is under the management of the Ministry of Human Resources and Social Security, which resulted from the merger of the Ministry of Personnel and the Ministry of Human Resources and Social Security. The function of the administration covers management, recruitment, assessment, training, rewards, supervision and other aspects related to civil service affairs. The administration also has several new functions. These include drawing up regulations on the trial periods of newly enrolled personnel, further protecting the legal rights of civil servants and having the responsibility of the registration of civil servants under central departments. Its establishment was part of the government's reshuffle in 2008. It aimed at a "super ministry" system to streamline government department functions.

Salary and allowances
There are three main components of civil service pay according to the 2006 pay regulation by the State Council of the People's Republic of China, namely base pay (基本工资), cost-of-living allowances (津补贴), and bonus (奖金).

See also 

 Politics of China
 Cadre system of the Chinese Communist Party
 Orders of precedence in the People's Republic of China
 Administrative divisions of China
 Chinese Academy of Governance
 Chinese Public Administration Society
 Examination Yuan, the Republican era equivalent now operates on Taiwan since 1949.

References

Government of China